Abbey Head is a headland on the Solway Firth coast of Dumfries and Galloway.

References

Geography of Dumfries and Galloway